Tanaka is the fourth most common Japanese surname.

Tanaka may also refer to:

Tanaka, a district of Nagano Prefecture, Japan
Tanaka Station, a railway station in Tanaka district, Nagano Prefecture, Japan
Tanaka Business School, part of Imperial College, London
Uonuma-Tanaka Station, a railway station in Uonuma, Niigata Prefecture, Japan
Echigo-Tanaka Station, a railway station in Tsunan, Nakauonuma District, Niigata Prefecture, Japan
Kashiwa-Tanaka Station, a train station in Kashiwa, Chiba Prefecture, Japan
Tanaka Power Equipment, makers of small internal combustion engines and associated machinery
Tanaka Seisakusho (Tanaka Engineering Works), which became Toshiba, a Japanese conglomerate
Tanaka Memorial, an alleged Japanese war planning document
Tanaka, a Japanese village merged with Kashiwa, Chiba
Tanaka Memorial Biological Station on the island of Miyake, Japan
 Tanaka (relief) contours technique

Given name 
Tanaka is a Shona word meaning "we are good" which is used as a given name in Zimbabwe:
Tanaka Chinyahara Zimbabwean professional footballer

See also
Tanaka formula (disambiguation)
Tanakan, a trade name for EGb176, a standardized extract of Ginko biloba.
Tanakh, a canon of the Hebrew bible
Thanaka, a yellowish-white cosmetic paste made from ground bark, also known as Tanaka